The SFCA Taupin was a French tandem-wing aircraft, designed to provide a simple, stable and safe aircraft able to take-off and land in small spaces.

Design and development

In 1907 Louis Peyret, a friend of Louis Blériot designed the tandem wing Bleriot VI. Alex Manerol, flying the Peyret Tandem won the 1922 Itford glider contest and in 1924 Peyret obtained a patent for it. He continued to build designs of this type as well as more conventional aircraft until his death in 1933, after which his patent rights were purchased by the Société Française de Construction Aéronautique (SFCA). In 1935 they designed and built the tandem wing Taupin which, apart from a different engine, was very similar to the Peyret VI of 1933. Taupin is the French vernacular name for beetles of the family Elateridae or click-beetles, known for their ability to jump rapidly into the air.

The Taupin had rectangular plan wings, the forward one providing 65% of the wing area, both mounted on the central fuselage longeron. They were wooden two spar structures, fabric covered and braced from below with parallel pairs of forward leaning struts to the lower fuselage longerons, each pair stiffened with a horizontal cross-brace between them and with short upward secondary braces to the wings. The wings were mounted with equal and significant dihedral.  Both had full-span flaps which were interconnected and could move differentially as ailerons and elevators and together as camber changing flaps, a system first used on the glider and acknowledged as the source of its "extraordinary controllability".

The fuselage was a wooden structure with plywood covering. Its lower part was rectangular in section and the upper part roughly triangular, with a central longeron along its top to which the wings were joined.  This member was visible above the open cockpit, placed immediately under the wing trailing edge and formed by opening the upper fuselage. Ahead of the cockpit, and on some examples behind it, the upper surfaces were inwardly dished to improve the pilot's view and there was a cut-out in the wing trailing edge for the same reason, much bigger than that shown in L'Aéronatique.  The Taupin had a  Mengin C air-cooled flat-twin engine, sometimes referred to as a Poinsard after its designer, in the nose with its cylinders exposed and supplied from a fuel tank in the fuselage.  At the rear the vertical tail was conventional, with a triangular fin bearing a round-topped, straight-edged unbalanced rudder which reached down to the keel and operated in a small cut-out in the rear wing control surfaces.

The Taupin had tailskid landing gear with its low pressure mainwheels mounted on V-struts hinged from the lower longerons and with a single telescopic strut on each side to the mid-upper longerons, though the drawing in L'Aéronatique shows a different, split axle undercarriage.

The exact date of the Taupin's first flight is not known, though it was before late October 1935 when it took part successfully in the 1935 Tour de France des Prototypes. Later that year it went for certification at Villacoublay; it returned to SFCA in January 1936 for modifications, restarting testing at Villacoublay in April. It lived up to its name, needing only  to take off.

During 1937 SFCA introduced a two-seat version of the Taupin, the Taupin 5/2.  This had a  Regnier inverted inline engine, wings with duralumin tube spars and side-by-side seats. Take-off weight rose by 80% but the dimensions were only slightly increased.

Immediately after World War II SFCA introduced the metal framed Lignel 44 Cross-Country, which had dimensions slightly larger than the Taupin 5/2, a  Régnier 4 D2 inverted inline engine and a new, enclosed cabin fuselage; the seats, accessed by side doors, were still under the trailing edge of the wing though without a cut-out. As in the earlier designs there was no vertical separation of the wings, both mounted on the upper fuselage longerons.

Operational history

SFCA quickly put the Taupin into production, with five completed in March and another twenty planned for April. The price was FF 15,000. The final production figures were forty-eight Taupins, four Taupin 5/2s and one Lignell 44. The reconstructed French pre-war register shows that many of the single seat aircraft were used in the national Aviation Populaire programme, though others were used by French aero-clubs.

In July 1937 Louis Clément in a Taupin won the rally at the Zurich meeting ahead of a large field.

At least two of the tandem wing types flew for several years after World War II.  The Lignel 44 was destroyed in an accident in May 1955, killing Louis Clément but Taupin F-AZBG remained on the French register in 2014.

Variants
Peyret VI 1933 tandem of same dimensions and appearance but with a  ABC Scorpion flat-twin
SFCA Taupin original design, 48 built.
SFCA Taupin 5/2 side-by-side two seater, 4 built. 
SFCA Lignel 44 Cross-Country 1946 cabin version, 1 built.

Specifications (Taupin)

References

Tandem-wing aircraft
1930s French sport aircraft
SFCA aircraft
Peyret aircraft
Single-engined tractor aircraft
Aircraft first flown in 1935
High-wing aircraft